John Trevor Sparling (born 24 July 1938) is a former New Zealand cricketer who played in 11 Test matches between 1958 and 1964.

Domestic career
A stocky, fair-haired, off-spinning all-rounder, Sparling was educated at Auckland Grammar School. Coached in Auckland by Jim Laker, he broke into the Auckland team at the age of 18. He continued to play for Auckland until 1970–71. He captained Auckland through most of the 1960s, leading the team to two Plunket Shield titles.

His most successful season with the bat was 1959–60, when he made 705 runs at an average of 37.10. In the Plunket Shield match against Canterbury that season he scored 105 and 51 and took 7 for 98 and 2 for 13.

His most successful season with the ball was 1964–65, when he took 38 wickets at an average of 15.50. His career-best figures that year, 7 for 49 for Auckland against Otago, took Auckland to a narrow victory.

International career
Sparling was the youngest member of the New Zealand cricket team that toured England in 1958. On a tour where New Zealand were badly outclassed and in a summer where the weather was almost uniformly dismal, Sparling was one of the few players to emerge with an enhanced reputation. Wisden called him the player with "undoubtedly most promise" and wrote: "A natural cricketer, he should come to the fore with so many years ahead of him."

In fact, Sparling's figures for the tour were fairly modest: 513 runs at an average of less than 18 runs per innings and 38 wickets at just over 20 runs a wicket. He played in the last three of the five Tests and his 50 at Old Trafford on his 20th birthday was one of only three 50s scored by the Test side all summer. His stand of 61 for the seventh wicket with Eric Petrie in this match was the highest stand for New Zealand in the whole series.

Predictions of an illustrious Test career were, however, wide of the mark. Sparling played twice against the touring English side in 1958–59, three times on the New Zealand tour of South Africa in 1961–62, once against England in New Zealand in 1962–63 and twice in the home series against South Africa in 1963–64. In none of these matches did Sparling reach 50 as a batsman and in none of them did he take more than one wicket in an innings. He played in all four of the matches New Zealand played against the visiting Australian team in 1959–60, scoring two fifties and taking six wickets, but they were not Test matches. Sparling was unavailable for the tour of India, Pakistan and England in 1965, and the selectors turned to the younger spin-bowling all-rounders Bryan Yuile, Vic Pollard and Ross Morgan. 

At Auckland in the New Zealand v England Test match in February 1963, Sparling bowled an 11-ball over when the umpire, Dick Shortt, lost count of the number of balls Sparling had bowled.

References

External links
 
 "Last Over with Erin: John Sparling" from the New Zealand Cricket Museum

1938 births
Living people
People educated at Auckland Grammar School
New Zealand Test cricketers
New Zealand cricketers
Auckland cricketers
People from Mount Eden
North Island cricketers